The Albu Baronetcy, of Grosvenor Place in the City of Westminster, and Johannesburg in the Province of Transvaal in the Union of South Africa, is a title in the Baronetage of the United Kingdom. It was created on 12 February 1912 for the South African mining magnate George Albu. He was the founder of the General Mining and Finance Corporation alongside his brother Leopold Albu.  the title is held by the first Baronet's grandson, the third Baronet, who succeeded his father in 1963.

The Albu family is of German-Jewish origin.

Albu baronets, of Grosvenor Place and of Johannesburg (1912)
Sir George Albu, 1st Baronet (1857–1935)
Sir George Werner Albu, 2nd Baronet (1905–1963)
Sir George Albu, 3rd Baronet (b. 1944)

There is no heir to the baronetcy.

Arms

Notes

References
Kidd, Charles, Williamson, David (editors). Debrett's Peerage and Baronetage (1990 edition). New York: St Martin's Press, 1990, 

Albu